Adam Frank Froese (born August 13, 1991) is a Canadian field hockey player who plays as a defender or midfielder for India Club and the Canadian national team.

International career
Froese played for the Canada national field hockey team at the 2015 Pan American Games and won a silver medal. In 2016, he was named to Canada's Olympic team. In June 2019, he was selected in the Canada squad for the 2019 Pan American Games, which will be his third Pan American Games. They won the silver medal as they lost 5–2 to Argentina in the final.

References

External links
 
 Adam Froese at Field Hockey Canada
 
 
 Adam Frank Froese at the 2019 Pan American Games

1991 births
Living people
People from Petaling District
Canadian male field hockey players
Malaysian male field hockey players
Male field hockey defenders
Male field hockey midfielders
Field hockey players at the 2010 Commonwealth Games
Field hockey players at the 2011 Pan American Games
Field hockey players at the 2014 Commonwealth Games
Field hockey players at the 2015 Pan American Games
Field hockey players at the 2016 Summer Olympics
Field hockey players at the 2018 Commonwealth Games
Field hockey players at the 2019 Pan American Games
Pan American Games silver medalists for Canada
Olympic field hockey players of Canada
Pan American Games medalists in field hockey
Canadian people of Malaysian descent
Medalists at the 2011 Pan American Games
Medalists at the 2015 Pan American Games
Medalists at the 2019 Pan American Games
Commonwealth Games competitors for Canada